Maple High School is a continuation high school in Vandenberg Village which provides alternative schooling for students whose educational needs aren't met in traditional comprehensive high school programs. The mission of the Maple High School is to ensure that all students learn, make progress towards graduation, and become thinking, contributing members of society. It is a part of the Lompoc Unified School District.

References

External links
 GreatSchools Inc: Maple High School 
 Maple High School

High schools in Santa Barbara County, California
Continuation high schools in California
Public high schools in California